Berlin is a city in Green Lake and Waushara counties in the U.S. state of Wisconsin. The population was 5,571 at the 2020 census. Of this, 5,435 were in Green Lake County, and only 89 were in Waushara County. The city is located mostly within the Town of Berlin in Green Lake County, with a small portion extending into the Town of Aurora in Waushara County.

History
In 1845, Nathan H. Strong (1813–1852) became the first resident of what is today Berlin. He was joined by Hugh G. Martin, Hiram Barnes, and William Dickey. Their settlement was known as Strong's Landing. In 1848 a post office was established. It was named Berlin after the capital of Prussia, now the capital of Germany. The first school house was built in 1850 and the first church in 1851. Berlin was incorporated as a city in 1857.

Pronunciation
Area residents put the accent on the first syllable of Berlin  rather than on the second. It has been said that this was in reaction to the anti-German sentiment that swept across the United States during World War I, and that the accent was previously on the second syllable.

Geography
Berlin is located at  (43.969732, −88.948717). The Fox River runs north-south through the middle of the city splitting it.

Transportation
Berlin is served by Wisconsin Highway 49 and Wisconsin Highway 91.

Demographics

2010 census
As of the census of 2010, there were 5,524 people, 2,296 households, and 1,423 families residing in the city. The racial makeup of the city was 93.4% White, 0.5% African American, 0.6% Native American, 0.9% Asian, 3.6% from other races, and 1.0% from two or more races. Hispanic or Latino of any race were 8.0% of the population.

There were 2,296 households, of which 31.3% had children under the age of 18 living with them, 44.4% were married couples living together, 11.8% had a female householder with no husband present, 5.7% had a male householder with no wife present, and 38.0% were non-families. 32.0% of all households were made up of individuals, and 14.9% had someone living alone who was 65 years of age or older. The average household size was 2.38 and the average family size was 3.00.

The median age in the city was 39 years. 25.8% of residents were under the age of 18; 7.2% were between the ages of 18 and 24; 24.8% were from 25 to 44; 25.7% were from 45 to 64; and 16.4% were 65 years of age or older. The gender makeup of the city was 48.5% male and 51.5% female.

2000 census
As of the census of 2000, there were 5,305 people, 2,170 households, and 1,425 families residing in the city. The population density was 887.4 people per square mile (342.5/km2). There were 2,391 housing units at an average density of 400.0 per square mile (154.4/km2). The racial makeup of the city was 95.70% White, 0.15% Black or African American, 0.28% Native American, 0.77% Asian, 0.02% Pacific Islander, 2.47% from other races, and 0.60% from two or more races. 4.56% of the population were Hispanic or Latino of any race.

There were 2,170 households, out of which 31.5% had children under the age of 18 living with them, 51.8% were married couples living together, 9.4% had a female householder with no husband present, and 34.3% were non-families. 30.3% of all households were made up of individuals, and 15.3% had someone living alone who was 65 years of age or older. The average household size was 2.39 and the average family size was 2.96.

In the city, the population was spread out, with 25.1% under the age of 18, 7.4% from 18 to 24, 28.1% from 25 to 44, 21.4% from 45 to 64, and 18.0% who were 65 years of age or older. The median age was 38 years. For every 100 females, there were 92.2 males. For every 100 females age 18 and over, there were 88.4 males.

The median income for a household in the city was $36,896, and the median income for a family was $44,922. Males had a median income of $31,512 versus $21,658 for females. The per capita income for the city was $17,667. About 3.6% of families and 7.0% of the population were below the poverty line, including 5.3% of those under age 18 and 11.8% of those age 65 or over.

Religion
St. John's Evangelical Lutheran Church is a Lutheran Church–Missouri Synod church 
 and St. Paul's Evangelical Lutheran Church is a Wisconsin Evangelical Lutheran Synod church in Berlin

Media

News media
Berlin Journal is a weekly newspaper published in Berlin, Wisconsin.

Radio
WISS (AM) is the area radio station in Berlin, Wisconsin.

Notable people

 Nelson F. Beckwith – Wisconsin State Assembly
 Fred Blair – candidate for Wisconsin Governor and U.S. Senate
 William A. Bugh - lawyer and Wisconsin State Assembly
 Valentine Detling - Wisconsin State Assembly
 David Evans, Jr. - Wisconsin State Assembly
 George Fitch - Wisconsin State Senator
 Patricia A. Goodrich - Wisconsin State Assembly
 Chris Greisen – NFL player
 Gerald Heaney - magician
 Katherine Davies Jones - botanist
 Andy Jorgensen - Wisconsin State Assembly
 William Nigh - actor and director
 Luther Olsen - Wisconsin State Senator
 Hans H. Olson - Wisconsin State Assembly
 Reuben W. Peterson - Wisconsin State Assembly
 Luther Reed - screenwriter and film director
 Daniel E. Riordan - Wisconsin State Senator
 Hobart Sterling Sacket - Wisconsin State Assembly and Senate
 Fred W. Schlueter - Wisconsin State Assembly
 August E. Smith - Wisconsin State Assembly
 Newcomb Spoor - Wisconsin State Assembly
 George D. Waring - Wisconsin State Senator
 Christian C. Wellensgard - Wisconsin State Assembly
 Dora V. Wheelock (1847–1923) - temperance activist and writer
 Ferdinand T. Yahr - Wisconsin State Senator

Images

References

Further reading
Newspaper articles describing Berlin's history

External links
 City of Berlin
 Sanborn fire insurance maps: 1884 1891 1895 1900 1911

Cities in Wisconsin
Cities in Green Lake County, Wisconsin
Cities in Waushara County, Wisconsin